Hob Broun (born Heywood Orren Broun; 1950 – December 16, 1987) was an author who lived in Portland, Oregon.  Following the publication of his first novel, Odditorium, Broun required spinal surgery to remove a tumor that ultimately saved his life but resulted in his paralysis. Subsequently, he wrote two books by blowing air through a tube that activated the specially outfitted keyboard of a computer. Using this technology, he completed a second novel, Inner Tube, and wrote the short stories contained in a posthumously published collection entitled Cardinal Numbers which won an Oregon Book Award in 1989. He was working on a third novel when he died of asphyxiation after his respirator broke down in his home in Portland, Oregon. He was thirty-seven years old.

Broun was born in Manhattan and graduated from the Dalton School. He attended Reed College in Portland. He was the son of Heywood Hale Broun, the writer and broadcaster, and the grandson of Ruth Hale, a freelance writer and founder of the Lucy Stone League, and Heywood Broun, the newspaper columnist.

References

1950 births
1987 deaths
Writers from Portland, Oregon
Reed College alumni
20th-century American novelists
20th-century American male writers
American male novelists
Novelists from Oregon